The  was a trading and shipping company and private navy, considered to be the first corporation in modern Japan.

Kaientai, originally named Kameyama Shachū (亀山社中, "Kameyama Troupe"), was founded by Sakamoto Ryōma in Nagasaki in 1865 during the Bakumatsu, and it was initially funded by the Satsuma Domain and other groups and domains.

The logo of SoftBank Group is based on the idea of a "21st century Kaientai".

Members of Kaientai

Born in Tosa Domain 
 Sakamoto Ryōma – a commanding officer of Kaientai
 Iwasaki Yatarou
 Sawamura Sōnojho
 Sasaki Takayuki – a second commanding officer of Kaientai after Ryōma's death
 Nagaoka Ken'ichi
 Ishida Eikichi
 Sakamoto Nao – Ryōma's adopted child
 Sugano Kakubei
 Jingū Umanosuke
 Nomura Koreaki

Born in Echizen Province 
 Seki Yoshiomi
 Watanabe Gōhachi
 Odani Kōzō

Born in Kishū Domain 
 Mutsu Munemitsu

References

External links 

 Nagasaki Kameyamashachū  Memorial Museum (Japanese)

Nagasaki
1860s establishments in Japan
Meiji Restoration
Japanese Navy
Shipping companies of Japan